Lorenzo Celsi (born Venice, c. 1310 – died there 18 July 1365) was a Venetian statesman who served as the 58th Doge of Venice, from 16 July 1361 until his death.

Biography
He was the son of a rich Celsi family, and was previously noted for leading a flotilla against Genoa to help preserve Venetian interests. He was married to Marchesina Ghisi. During his reign, Celsi confronted the revolt of St. Tito
in Crete, a rebellion that overthrew the official Venetian authorities and attempted to create an independent state.
Celsi was succeeded as Doge by Marco Cornaro.

References

1310s births
1365 deaths
14th-century Doges of Venice